Year 1359 (MCCCLIX) was a common year starting on Tuesday (link will display the full calendar) of the Julian calendar.

Events 
 January–December 
 May 25 – The French States-General repudiates the terms of the Second Treaty of London, signed earlier in the year between England and France.
 June 21 – Upon the death of Erik Magnusson, his claims to the Swedish throne die with him, and power is restored undivided to his father, King Magnus.
 July 4 – Francesco II Ordelaffi surrenders to the Papal commander, Gil de Albornoz.
 August – Qulpa becomes Khan of the Blue Horde after the death of Berdi Beg.
 August 23 – Ismail II overthrows his uncle, Muhammed V, as Sultan of Granada (in modern-day Spain).
 September – Margaret, Countess of Tyrol, and her second husband, Louis V, Duke of Bavaria, are absolved from excommunication.
 December 19 – The Catalan Courts are held in Cervera, giving birth to the Deputation of the General of Catalonia (Diputació del General de Catalunya), also called Generalitat of Catalonia (Generalitat de Catalunya).

 Date unknown 
 Abu Salim Ali II overthrows Muhammad II as-Said as ruler of the Marinid dynasty, in modern-day Morocco.
 The Zayanids under Abu Hamuw II recapture Algeria.
 Shah Mahmud overthrows his brother, Shah Shuja, as leader of the Muzaffarid tribe in Persia.
 Ananda Patel (considered common ancestor for most of the modern-day population of Bhadran) moves to Bhadran from Anklav. 
 Berlin joins the Hanseatic League.
 probable date – Battle of Megara: A Christian coalition defeats a Turkish raider fleet.
 earliest possible date – Bogdan I becomes Prince of Moldavia (modern-day Moldova) after freeing it from Hungarian control. He will be ancestor of the House of Bogdan, who will rule Moldavia for more than three centuries.

Births 
 January 11 – Emperor Go-En'yū of Japan (d. 1393)
 July 15 – Antonio Correr, Spanish cardinal (d. 1445)
 probable – Owain Glyndŵr, last Welsh Prince of Wales (d. 1416)

Deaths 
 June 21 – Erik Magnusson, king of Sweden since 1356 (b. 1339)
 October 10 – King Hugh IV of Cyprus (b. 1310)
 October 25 – Beatrice of Castile, queen consort of Portugal (b. 1293)
 November 13 – Ivan II of Russia, Grand Duke of Moscovy (b. 1326)
 December 14 – Cangrande II della Scala, Lord of Verona (b. 1332)
 date unknown – Jeanne de Clisson, French noblewoman and privateer (b. 1300)

References